Olivia Hasler (born September 14, 1992), better known by the ring name Penelope Ford, is an American professional wrestler signed to All Elite Wrestling. She is also known for her work in Combat Zone Wrestling.

Professional wrestling career

Combat Zone Wrestling (2014–2018)
Ford debuted during the December 17 edition of the CZW Dojo Wars, where she and George Gatton defeated Conor Claxton & Frankie Pickard in a tag team match. She won her first CZW singles match on the December 31, defeating Dave McCall. In 2015, Ford would appear in a variety of tag team matches and a few singles matches in between. She faced Brittany Blake in a singles match on the June 10 edition of the CZW Dojo Wars where Blake defeated her. At CZW Cerebral 2015, Ford wrestled a dark match won by Blake. Their rivalry continued on December 16 in a Best Two Out Of Three Falls title match for the CZW Medal Of Valor Championship. Ford was unable to capture the title from Blake during this match, closing out her second year in CZW. During the course of 2016, Ford continued her steady work of tag team matches and other match specialties, picking up a small number of singles victories along the way.

She finished 2016 in a match on December 7, with a loss to Jordynne Grace, an opponent she first wrestled seven months earlier in 2016 at WSU Unshakable. Their rematch ended in the same result, with Grace defeating Ford.

All Elite Wrestling (2019–present)

On January 8, 2019, AEW announced that Ford would be joining the company alongside Joey Janela later in 2019. She later began managing  her real-life boyfriend Kip Sabian as they feuded with Janela. On October 9, 2019, Ford had her first match in AEW on the first ever AEW Dark episode where she teamed up with Bea Priestley against Allie and Britt Baker where they were defeated. Ford picked up her first win in AEW on the March 3 episode of Dark where she teamed with Britt Baker to defeat Yuka Sakazaki and Riho.

On May 23, 2020, Ford had her first ever PPV match on Double or Nothing facing Kris Statlander which Ford was a last minute replacement in the match due to Britt Baker being injured where Ford was defeated. On the June 10 episode of AEW Dynamite, Ford teamed with Nyla Rose to defeat Hikaru Shida and Kris Statlander where she pinned Shida thus earning her an AEW Women's World Championship match at Fyter Fest. At the event, Ford was unsuccessful at capturing the title as she was defeated by Shida. At All Out, Ford announced that she and Sabian were getting married while also teasing that they will reveal who his best man is for the wedding on the following Dynamite. On the September 9 episode of Dynamite, Miro was revealed to be the best man for Sabian and Ford's wedding. On the October 23, 2021 episode of Dynamite, Ford competed in the AEW TBS Women's championship tournament where she faced Ruby Soho and lost. After months of feuding, Ford and The Bunny lost in a street fight against Anna Jay and Tay Conti on the December 31, 2021 episode of AEW Rampage. On July 8, 2022, after Tony Khan received criticism over not utilizing Ford since January, he announced that she is not medically clear to compete. On August 15, Ford made her return to AEW on AEW Dark Elevation defeating Heather Reckless by submission.

Personal life
Hasler dated wrestler Joey Janela on and off for four years, before the two broke up in late 2018. In April 2020, Hasler got engaged to Kip Sabian. On the December 23, 2020 episode of AEW Dynamite: Holiday Bash, Sabian and Ford announced that they would have a beach wedding on the February 3, 2021 episode of AEW Dynamite: Beach Break. They married on February 3, 2021.

Championships and accomplishments
 All Elite Wrestling
 AEW Dynamite Awards (1 time)
 Biggest WTF Moment (2022) – 
DDT Pro-Wrestling
Ironman Heavymetalweight Championship (1 time)
Pro Wrestling After Dark
SAW Women's Championship (1 time)
Pro Wrestling Illustrated
Ranked No. 48 of the top 100 female wrestlers in the PWI Women's 100 in 2020
Queens of Combat
 QOC Tag Team Championship (1 time) – with Maria Manic
Women Superstars Uncensored
WSU Tag Team Championship (1 time) – with Maria Manic

References

External links

1992 births
All Elite Wrestling personnel
American female professional wrestlers
American YouTubers
Living people
Professional wrestlers from Arizona
Professional wrestling managers and valets
Sportspeople from Phoenix, Arizona
Twitch (service) streamers
21st-century American women
21st-century professional wrestlers